Cryptomyzus is a genus of true bugs belonging to the family Aphididae.

The species of this genus are found in Europe and Eastern Asia.

Species:
 Cryptomyzus galeopsidis
 Cryptomyzus korschelti
 Cryptomyzus ribis

References

Aphididae